Rose moss is a common name of several plants and may refer to:

Portulaca grandiflora, a flowering plant cultivated in gardens
Rhodobryum roseum, a moss with a wide native distribution